This is a list of the best selling singles, albums and as according to IRMA. Further listings can be found here.

Top-selling singles
'Lewis Capaldi – "Someone You Loved"
Lil Nas X – "Old Town Road"
Billie Eilish – "Bad Guy"
Tones and I – "Dance Monkey"
Dermot Kennedy – "Outnumbered"
Dominic Fike – "3 Nights"
Lady Gaga and Bradley Cooper – "Shallow"
Ed Sheeran and Justin Bieber – "I Don't Care"
Ariana Grande – "7 rings"
Shawn Mendes and Camila Cabello – "Señorita"

Top-selling albums*
Notes:
''Divinely Uninspired To A Hellish Extent – Lewis CapaldiThe Greatest Showman – Motion Picture Cast Recording
When We All Fall Asleep Where Do We Go – Billie Eilish
Without Fear – Dermot Kennedy
No. 6 Collaborations Project – Ed Sheeran
Thank U, Next – Ariana Grande
A Star Is Born – Motion Picture Cast Recording
Bohemian Rhapsody - OST – Queen
Staying at Tamara's – George Ezra
÷ – Ed SheeranNotes:'''
 *Compilation albums are not included.

References 

2019 in Irish music
2019